Vermont Route 12 (VT 12) is a  north-south state highway in Vermont that runs from Weathersfield to Morrisville.

Moose are most often encountered on four roads in Vermont, of which this is one. They are seen from Worcester to Elmore.

Route description
Route 12 begins at the New Hampshire state line on the Connecticut River in the town of Weathersfield. It continues north along the west bank of the Connecticut River, overlapped with U.S. Route 5, until Hartland. It then heads northwest to Woodstock and then north through Montpelier to end at Vermont Route 15A in Morrisville. Vermont Route 12 runs parallel to Interstate 89 from the Woodstock/Hartford vicinity to Montpelier.

Major intersections

Vermont Route 12A

Vermont Route 12A is a state highway in central Vermont, United States. It provides an alternate route to VT 12 between Randolph and Northfield, via Braintree, Granville and Roxbury.

The road currently used by Vermont Route 12A was originally designated New England Interstate Route 12A as part of the New England Interstate Route System and existed as such until it was replaced by a different system in 1926.

Major intersections

See also
Vermont Route 14 - The northernmost section used to be New England Route 12B

References

External links

012